Mohammad Ansari or Mohammed Ansari may refer to:

 Mohammad Ansari (cricketer), Pakistani cricketer
 Mohammad Ansari (footballer) (born 1991), Iranian football defender
 Mohammad Abbas Ansari (born 1936), political leader and Shia cleric from Indian-administered Jammu and Kashmir
Mohammad Bagher Ansari (born 1946), Iranian Twelver Shi'a Islamic theologian, Islamic law scholar and philosopher
 Mohammad Ebrahim Ansari (1936–2011), Iraqi Twelver Shi'a Marja
Mohammad H. Ansari, Canadian theoretical physicist
 Mohammad Hamid Ansari (born 1937), Vice President of India
Mohammed Jaber Al-Ansari (born 1939), Bahraini philosopher and political thinker
Mohammad Jasmir Ansari, Indian politician, Member of the Legislative Assembly
Muhammad Latif Ansari (1887–1979), Pakistani Shia Muslim scholar, poet, historian, and cleric who emigrated to Kenya
 Mohammad Yusuf Ansari (born 1958), Indian politician in Uttar Pradesh
Mohammed Yusuf Ansari (born 1970), Indian footballer for the national team